Umberto Albarella is an Italian-British archaeologist, prehistorian, and activist. He is  professor of Zooarchaeology at the Department of Archaeology, University of Sheffield. Albarella's previous work has been based in Britain, Italy, Armenia, Greece, the Netherlands, Germany, Switzerland, France, and Portugal.

Education 
Albarella graduated from the University of Naples in the 1980s with a degree in Natural Science but became interested in anthropology and archaeology since being undergraduate student in 1982. In 2004, he received a PhD from the University of Durham, with a thesis titled The archaeology of pig domestication and husbandry : approaches and case studies, supervised by Peter Rowley-Conwy.

Career 
Between 1993 and 1995 Albarella worked at the London branch of English Heritage. He was then an archaeologist at the University of Birmingham from 1995 to 2000, and the University of Durham from 2000 to 2004. In 2004, Albarella joined the Department of Archaeology as a Research Officer to expand and develop the zooarchaeology lab. On the 15th June 2021, Albarella gave his professorship inaugural lecture at the University of Sheffield.

Albarella has written numerous journal articles, book chapters and edited volumes.  Pigs and humans: 10,000 years of interaction, published in 2007, was the first major attempt at synthesising archaeological studies of pigs. The 2011 volume, EthnoZooArchaeology: The Past and Present of Human-Animal Relationships, was described as "important collection of papers for both ethnoarchaeologists and zooarchaeologists". Albarella and colleagues edited the Oxford Handbook of Zooarchaeology, published in 2017 and noted for its international breadth and thematic diversity.

He has supervised numerous PhD students, including Richard Thomas, Angelos Hadjikoumis, Angela Trentacoste, Lizzie Wright. Albarella has served on the editorial boards of the journals Anthropozoologica, Environmental Archaeology and Medieval Archaeology. In 2002, he was elected onto the International Committee of ICAZ, and served as General Secretary of ICAZ from 2006 to 2012.

Albarella is a member of the ICAZ Committee of Honor, recognising individuals who have made a major contribution to archaeozoology. He is noted for his " keen sense of social responsibility" and is "much loved in the global community of zooarchaeologists".

Selected publications

Articles 
 Albarella, U., and Payne, S. 2005. Neolithic pigs from Durrington Walls, Wiltshire, England: a biometrical database. Journal of Archaeological Science 32.4: 589–599.
 Albarella U., Tagliacozzo A, Dobney K. & Rowley-Conwy, P. 2006. Pig hunting and husbandry in prehistoric Italy: a contribution to the domestication debate. Proceedings of the Prehistoric Society 72: 193–227.
 Albarella, U., Johnstone, C., & Vickers, K. 2008. The development of animal husbandry from the Late Iron Age to the end of the Roman period: a case study from South-East Britain. Journal of Archaeological Science, 35(7), 1828–1848.

Books 
 Albarella U. (ed.) 2001. Environmental Archaeology: Meaning and Purpose. Dordrecht, Boston, London: Kluwer Academic Publishers.
 Albarella, U., Dobney, K., Ervynck, A., & Rowley-Conwy, P. (eds.). 2007. Pigs and humans: 10,000 years of interaction. Oxford University Press on Demand.
 Albarella U. & Trentacoste A. (eds.) 2011. Ethnozooarchaeology. The Present and Past of Human-Animal Relationships. Oxford: Oxbow Books.
 Albarella U. with M. Rizzetto, H. Russ, K. Vickers & S. Viner (eds.) 2017. The Oxford Handbook of Zooarchaeology. Oxford: Oxford University Press.

References

Living people
Date of birth missing (living people)
Academics of the University of Sheffield
Academics of the University of Birmingham
Academics of Durham University
University of Naples Federico II alumni
Zooarchaeologists
Italian archaeologists
English archaeologists
20th-century archaeologists
21st-century archaeologists
Italian expatriates in England
Alumni of Durham University
Year of birth missing (living people)